Kalapahar (died 24 April 1583), also known by his daak naam Raju, was a military general of the Sultanate of Bengal under the Karrani dynasty. He is credited for conquering Orissa, which remained under Muslim rule up until the British conquest of India.

Family and background
Kalapahar was born in the 16th-century. The contemporary Makhzan-i-Afghani by Khwaja Niamatullah mentions his alias being "Raju", from which the orientalists Heinrich Blochmann and Henry Beveridge deduce a Hindu origin, and this is also backed up by local folklore. The colonial administrator and author Edward Albert Gait further describes him as a "Brahman renegade".

Military campaigns
With the growing influence of the Mughal Empire, the Sultan of Bengal, Sulaiman Khan Karrani, decided to send an expedition to annex Orissa under the leadership of his son Bayazid Khan Karrani and general Kalapahar. They defeated and killed King Mukunda Deva. Kalapahar then proceeded to led a contingent deep into the Orissa kingdom to subjugate it further, reaching as far as Puri. According to Jadunath Sarkar, Kalapahar's army raided the Jagannath Temple for its wealth. The Makhzan-i-Afghani by Khwaja Niamatullah mentions that the army took large amounts of gold from the temple.

The Orissa expedition made northern Bengal vulnerable to attacks from Cooch Behar under the Koch king Shukladhwaja. Kalapahar then led an army towards Cooch Behar, imprisoning Shukladhwaja and besieging his capital. However, Karrani feared invasions from the Mughal Army towards the west, and ordered Kalapahar to withdraw and restore the status quo. Subsequently, Shukladhwaja was freed in 1568.

In 1575, the Sultan's son Bayazid was treacherously murdered. Kalapahar rallied around Daud Karrani who ascended to the throne of the Bengal Sultanate. At the Battle of Tukaroi in March 1575, Kalapahar drove out the Mughal outpost in Ghoraghat although the Mughals were eventually victorious. Daud signed the Treaty of Cuttack which formally ceded the entire Sultanate to the Mughal Empire except Orissa. However, the treaty was broken after the death of Mughal general Munim Khan in October, and thus continued the Mughal-Karrani conflict. At the Battle of Rajmahal in July 1576, Kalapahar led the right wing of Daud's army. After the death of Junaid Khan by cannon, Kalapahar and his forces escaped alongside Qutlu Khan who was leading the vanguard. Though the battle marked the fall of the Karrani dynasty, Kalapahar continued to show resistance against the Mughals. Mirza Aziz Koka launched a third conquest of Bengal in 1583. During this conquest, Kalapahar rode a war elephant and led 800 cavalry. He died due to gunshot on 24 April.

Legacy
Kalapahar became a commonly mentioned figure in 19th-century fictional Bengali literature. The Kalapahar novel, by Girish Chandra Ghosh, is about a Hindu boy named Kalachand who falls in love with Rukhsana, a supposed daughter of Sultan Sulaiman Khan Karrani, but is guided by Jagannath to a girl named Chintamoni instead. In 1961, Subodh Ghosh wrote a short story titled "Ekti Shopner Ahban" which focues on the transition of a boy named Rajiblochan Ray, lovingly called Raju, who later converted to Islam, taking the name Kalapahar and becoming the general and son-in-law of the Muslim ruler of Bengal. Other fictional novels and plays written on Kalapahar include those written by Bidhubhushan Basu, Mohitlal Majumdar, Mukunda Das and Purnachandra Kanungo.

The term Kalapahar (or Black Mountain in English) has come to mean iconoclast among the Hindu population in Bengal, East and Northeast India. It has also been used derogatorily against Bengali Muslims and other Muslims of the eastern part of the subcontinent. In March 2021, the Indian Minister of Home Affairs Amit Shah referred to AIUDF leader Badruddin Ajmal as Kalapahar and as an infiltrator.

See also
 History of Bengal
 History of Odisha
 History of India
 Bengali Muslims

References

Bibliography

History of Odisha
1583 deaths
Year of birth unknown
Sunni Muslims
Bengali Muslims
16th-century Bengalis
16th-century Indian Muslims
Bengal Sultanate officers
Generals of the medieval Islamic world